Bigger (styled as Bigger: The Joe Weider Story) is a 2018 American comedy-drama film by director George Gallo about the life of real life bodybuilders Joe and Ben Weider.

Premise
Brothers Joe and Ben Weider were the architects of Muscle. Against all odds, they launched an empire. Along the way they discovered Arnold Schwarzenegger, inspired female empowerment, championed diversity, and started a movement that changed the world of bodybuilding in the United States.

Cast
Tyler Hoechlin as Joe Weider
Aneurin Barnard as Ben Weider
Julianne Hough as Betty Weider
Victoria Justice as Huguette "Kathy" Weider (Based on Hedwiges "Vicky" Uzar)
Steve Guttenberg as Louis Weider
DJ Qualls as Michael Steere
Tom Arnold as Roy Hawkins
Calum Von Moger as Arnold Schwarzenegger
Colton Haynes as Jack LaLanne
Max Martini as Jerry George
Kevin Durand as Bill Hauk (Based on Bob Hoffman)
Robert Forster as Joe Weider in 2008
 Stan De Longeaux as Claude Regine
 James Adam Madsen Jr. as Bill Pearl
 Sergio Oliva Jr. as Sergio Oliva Sr.

Reception
On Metacritic, the film has a weighted average score of 37 out of 100 based on 5 critics, indicating "generally unfavorable reviews". Michael Rechtshaffen of Los Angeles Times wrote: "Without a sturdier script featuring fully dimensional characters... the performances prove to be as unconvincing as their ethnic accents and period wigs."

References

External links
 

2018 films
2010s English-language films
2018 comedy-drama films
American comedy-drama films
Bodybuilding films
Cultural depictions of Arnold Schwarzenegger
Films directed by George Gallo
Films scored by Jeff Beal
2010s American films